In Greek mythology, Selinus (Modern: Σελινούντας Selinoúntas) was a native king of Aegalea (Ἀιγάλεια Aigáleia) in Achaea. The kingdom which used to exist is located in the present-day Aigio.

Mythology 
Selinus who being at war with Ion, offered him his only daughter Helice and proposed to adopt him as son and successor. Ion agreed to this and on his father-in-law's death, he became king of the Aegialians.

Notes

References

 Graves, Robert, The Greek Myths: The Complete and Definitive Edition. Penguin Books Limited. 2017. 
 Pausanias, Description of Greece with an English Translation by W.H.S. Jones, Litt.D., and H.A. Ormerod, M.A., in 4 Volumes. Cambridge, MA, Harvard University Press; London, William Heinemann Ltd. 1918. . Online version at the Perseus Digital Library
 Pausanias, Graeciae Descriptio. 3 vols. Leipzig, Teubner. 1903.  Greek text available at the Perseus Digital Library.

The first version of the article is translated from the article at the Greek Wikipedia (el:Main Page)

Kings in Greek mythology
Achaea